Hooknose snake is a common name which can refer to 9 species of snake found throughout the southwestern United States and Mexico:

Genus Ficimia
Genus Gyalopion

Animal common name disambiguation pages